Statistics of the 1999–2000 Saudi Premier League.

Stadia and locations

Final league table

Championship playoffs

Semifinals

First legs

Second legs

Championship final

External links 
 RSSSF Stats
 Saudi Arabia Football Federation
 Saudi League Statistics

Saudi Premier League seasons
Saudi Professional League
Professional League